Yes! is the eighth studio album by Detroit hip hop group Slum Village, released June 16, 2015, on Ne'astra Music.

Background
The 12-track LP features nine songs produced or co-produced posthumously by the late member J Dilla. Vocals of late members J Dilla and Baatin were also placed on the album. 
Yes! also features appearances from De La Soul, Phife, Black Milk, Frank Nitt, Bilal and J Dilla's younger brother Illa J.

Track listing
Credits were adapted from the album's liner notes.

Notes
J Dilla's vocals and instrumental beats and Baatin's vocals recorded in 1994–1995.

Sample credits
"Expressive" contains a sample of "Tom's Diner", by Suzanne Vega.
"Push It Along" contains a sample of "Push It Along", by A Tribe Called Quest.

References 

2015 albums
Slum Village albums
Albums produced by J Dilla
Albums produced by Black Milk